The Indios de Mayagüez (Mayagüez Indians) are a baseball team in Puerto Rico's Liga de Béisbol Profesional Roberto Clemente (Roberto Clemente Professional Baseball League, in Spanish). Based in Mayagüez, the Indios have won 19 national championships and two Caribbean World Series. It is one of four teams remaining from the original six incorporated into the LBPPR at its founding in 1938.

The Indios were named after the formerly named Cervecería India (now the Compañía Cervecera de Puerto Rico, or CCC), the local brewery, and its formal sponsor over most of the team's 75-year run) besides the fact that Mayagüez, located at the western coast of Puerto Rico, has a strong indigenous heritage, starting with the city's name (which is derived from the Taíno language). The team's colors are burgundy, red and gold, which at one time were the colors on the label of Cerveza India, the original flagship product of the brewery which promoted the team and served as base for its name. The CCC's current flagship product, Cerveza Medalla Light, is now the team's official endorser.

The Indios de Mayagüez team is the team with the most championship wins in PRBL history (nineteen, as of January 26, 2023). It has reached the PRBL final series 34 times (as of said date). At a time when most Puerto Rican cities and towns are better known for their support of basketball or volleyball teams, the city of Mayagüez remains as a strong baseball stronghold in the island nation. The team's fan base has a reputation for loyalty bordering in the extreme, and average game attendance by Indios fans has been consistently high (and at times the highest) in the Puerto Rico winter league during recent seasons.

At any given year — should the Indios make it to the PRBL tournament playoffs — attendance to the team's baseball park and post
-game celebrations tend to be particularly high because they usually coincide with the celebration of the patron saint feasts (fiestas patronales) for the city of Mayagüez; it is not unusual for a championship game to coincide with Candlemas (2 February) or Candlemas Eve.

The Indios' management team is led by general manager Frankie Thon (the brother of former MLB player Dickie Thon). The team's administrator is Raúl Villalobos. Carlos Baerga is the team's current manager (as of the 2013–2014 season).

The early years 
Baseball had been played in Mayagüez since the Spanish–American War; a city yearbook from the 1970s claimed that the very same day troops of the United States Army invaded the city (August 11, 1898), the troops played an impromptu baseball game on the city's main plaza. However, evidence tends to confirm that baseball became a regular pastime in the city by 1902.

Mayagüez had semi-professional baseball teams prior to the 1938 founding of the team, through various inceptions. The earliest team was named "Pope-Hartford" (after the automotive brand), and was organized in 1905 by Santiago Panzardi, the brand's importer. It was later substituted by a succession of teams: the Mayagüez Cardinals, the Yaguez, and others. These teams played games against organized teams from the rest of the island, Venezuela and Cuba, as well as teams assembled from Negro league baseball players.

Once the LBPPR was created, the Mayagüez team became a part of it. A management team led by Alfonso Valdés Cobián owned the team during its initial years, between 1938 and 1957.

The Indios won their first LBPPR championship in 1949. Originally the Indios played their home games in the facilities of La Liga de París., now named the Santiago Lloréns baseball park, which has been in use since February 14, 1912. The team moved from their previous grounds to then-new Isidoro García Baseball Stadium, located near the southwest corner of the city, later that year.

The Babel Pérez era 
Babel Pérez assumed the management of the Indios after Alfonso Valdés. (He had worked for Don Alfonso since the late '40s) The Indios won two championships under his helm, in 1962–1963 and 1965–1966. Joe Christopher was a major player for the Indios during the period.

Pérez died suddenly in Bamberg, Germany in 1971, while visiting one of his daughters and new grandson, the great Ovidio Enrique Pérez II. Gloria Méndez Pérez, widow of Babel Pérez, owned the team until its sale in 1974, entering into baseball history as the first female to own a baseball team.

The Luis Gómez Monagas era 
A new management team led by Luis Gómez Monagas, a successful insurance businessman, and father. (and later one-time Uncle-in-law of Colombian actor and folk singer Carlos Vives) bought the Indios in 1974. At the time, after winning the 1965–66 league championship the Indios had had a dry spell, having earned only two championships in more than 15 years and consistently ending in last place in every LBPPR tournament between the 1966–67 season and the 1973–74 season, except the 1969–70, when the team made the playoffs in a very surprising fashion. On two occasions, the franchise threatened to move to Bayamón, but popular support kept the team in Mayagüez both times.  To make matters worse, the Isidoro García baseball stadium was in such a state of disrepair that it was literally unsafe for fans, players and field keepers.

The historic 1977–1978 team 
The 1977–1978 team literally saved the franchise from bankruptcy and oblivion. Managed by Rene Lacheman, and provided with a powerful lineup that featured Ron LeFlore, Jim Dwyer, Kurt Bevacqua and José Manuel Morales in the 1-4 spots, the team barely made it to the playoffs, to consequently sweep the semi-final and final series. The final game for the series had Mayagüez beat the coincidentally named Bayamón Cowboys with a score of 18–2. The team eventually made it to Mazatlán, Mexico, where it won the 1978 Caribbean World Series.

This was a turning point in the team's history. Fan support gave the Indios' management team enough financial solvency to save the franchise. From winning only three championships in 40 years, the team went on to win 13 championships in the 34 years following the 1978 season. Collective fan protests demanded repairs to the baseball stadium from its owner, the then-named Parks and Leisure Administration of Puerto Rico (now called the Puerto Rico Department of Recreation and Sports), a government agency that still owns and controls the new stadium that has since replaced the old one. The stadium was remodeled soon after (1980). The Indios under Gomez ownership went on to win four more championships (83-84, 85–86, 87–88, 88-89) for a total of five during his tenure.

The Luis Iván Méndez era 
In 1989 Gomez sold the team to Luis Iván Méndez, a former commentator for the team's radio broadcasts. This was a controversial move, since Méndez's extreme passion for the team was viewed with skepticism by some local fans, who considered him to be brash, arrogant, and motivated chiefly by money. As a broadcaster, Méndez had been a devil's advocate during the team's lean years, providing much necessary feedback to improve its lineup, but his comments were rather blunt at times, something that alienated team fans (he was even confrontational with a few of them). The fact that Méndez was the first non-native of the city to own the team (Méndez was a native of nearby San Sebastián, Puerto Rico) did not help. Some fans even suspected Méndez of wanting to move the team to his hometown, which had a successful AA League franchise.

Objectively, though, Méndez not only attempted to raise fan support to a near-religious status, but was also responsible for five championships and three runner-up spots. He was responsible for establishing or endorsing many team rituals, changing the team's colors to burgundy and gold, and even demanding that the Indios wear their own uniform (and not wear one with the name "Puerto Rico") when going to the Caribbean World Series. Many fans decided to have a love-hate relationship with Méndez, praising his business smarts and baseball acumen while hating him personally.

The Daniel Aquino era 
Méndez, who had grown tired of public criticism against him (and who faced a suspension from the LBPPR for assaulting a league peer), sold ownership of the team to Daniel Aquino, a native of the Dominican Republic who had earned a Mechanical Engineering degree from the nearby University of Puerto Rico at Mayagüez. The fans' reaction to Aquino, who was once the owner of the Leones del Escogido of the Dominican winter league, made the backlash against Méndez pale in comparison. Aquino had experienced considerable criticism in his home country for "watering down" the Leones' roster due to escalating payroll costs. Xenophobia played a role in criticism against Aquino, who repeatedly countered by saying that he had strong personal ties to Puerto Rico and Mayagüez, and that after his experience with the Leones' he had realized that he would not jump into managing any other baseball team if he didn't have a personal stake in the team's outcome.

However, Aquino proved to be a successful owner, helped in part by the inclusion of yet another controversial (and very vocal) baseball executive, Carlos Pieve, to his management team (this time as general manager). Aquino's first year as owner had the Indios win a league championship (2003), only to have them end up last the following year (2004), and subsequently win yet another championship the next year (2005). The team lost the 2006 final series against the Gigantes de Carolina and lost again against the team in the semifinal round of the 2007 playoffs.

As their home stadium, Isidoro García Baseball Stadium, was demolished and rebuilt to host the 2010 Central American and Caribbean Games, the Indios were forced to relocate temporarily to nearby Aguadilla, Puerto Rico. They played at Luis A. Canena Marquez Stadium, under the name "Indios-Tiburones", a marketing concept that evoked the Tiburones de Aguadilla (Aguadilla Sharks), a now-defunct LBPPR team that was active in the 1940s and 1950s.

Puerto Rico Baseball League (PRBL) 
On November 18, 2009, the Lobos defeated the Indios. After defeating the Indios on November 19, 2009, the Gigantes gained the league's lead for a brief period of time. On November 25, 2009, the Indios defeated the Leones to win their fourth game of the season.

Mayagüez finished in fourth place in the regular season (2009–2010). They defeated the Lobos 4 games to 3 in the playoff to advance to their 30th championship series.

Indios de Mayagüez won their 16th championship (most in the PRBL) when they beat Criollos de Caguas 4 games to 1.  Three games in this series went to extra innings.

Best known former MLB players 

Major League Baseball players who played with the Indios include Dennis McClain, Boog Powell, Bradin Hagens, Jim Northrup, Willie Horton, Mickey Lolich, Jack Morris, Dave McNally, Tommy Lasorda, Ron LeFlore, Kurt Bevacqua, Lance Parrish, Paul O'Neill, Ken Caminiti, Zack Greinke, Doug Glanville, Harold Reynolds, Dennis Martínez, Danny Valencia, and Wally Joyner.

Local MLB stars who were also part of the Indios are Bombo Rivera, Willie Hernández, José Guzmán, Iván Calderón, Roberto Hernández, Iván Rodríguez, Bobby Bonilla, Wil Cordero, Jorge Posada and José Vidro. Cordero was raised at the by-now razed  Cócora section of town, which used to exist across the street from Isidoro García Baseball Stadium.

LBPPR Championships (team managers) 

1948-1949: Artie Wilson
1956-1957: Mickey Owen
1962-1963: Cal Ermer
1965-1966: Wayne Blackburn
1977-1978: Rene Lachemann
1983-1984: Frank Verdi
1985-1986: Nick Leyva
1987-1988: Jim Riggleman
1988-1989: Tom Gamboa
1991-1992: Pat Kelly
1996-1997: Tom Gamboa
1997-1998: Tom Gamboa
1998-1999: Al Newman
2002-2003: Nick Leyva
2004-2005: "Mako" (Max) Oliveras
2009-2010: "Mako" (Max) Oliveras
2011-2012: Dave Miley
2013-2014: Carlos Baerga

The Mayagüez All-Time All-Star Team 
In December 2003 a panel of five local sportscasters announced their picks for an Indios de Mayagüez All-Time All Star Team. This selection considered candidates from Indios teams from the previous 65 years. Their selected team lists as follows:

Denny McLain, P (RH)
Dave McNally, P (LH)
Lance Parrish, C
Brian Johnson, C
Wally Joyner, 1B
Carlos Manuel Santiago, 2B
Artie Wilson, SS
Kurt Bevacqua, 3B
Wilmer Fields, 3B (sometimes P, 1B)
Jim Dwyer, LF
Jim Northrup, CF
Luis A. "Canena" Márquez, RF
Lucius "Luke" Easter, DB

As of 2014, there has been talk among Mayaguez's sporting press community of updating the list sometime during the year.

Retired numbers

Indios iconography and traditions

Los Indios de mi pueblo 

A comment made on a broadcast by David Castro (see below) gave the team a moniker: "Los Indios de mi pueblo" ("My hometown's Indians").  Ramón S. Olivencia, a long-time news anchorman for various Puerto Rican news radio stations, and who was also born in Mayagüez, also made a habit of mentioning the phrase instead of reading the team's name, whenever he had to read baseball scores from the previous night on his broadcasts. The phrase stuck and it is still in common use, long after Olivencia's passing. It is usually the reference in use by native "mayagüezanos" when referring to the team.

The Indios de Mayagüez were initially sponsored by the local Cervecería India, founded in 1938 by local businessman Alfonso Valdés Cobián. For a while after Valdés' passing, the initials "AVC" were  added to the left sleeve of all team uniforms, in honor of the team's first owner. Once the Indios moved back to the rebuilt Isidoro García Stadium, Valdés' picture was incorporated to the left field fence, along with pictures of those team players whose numbers have been retired.

¡Ahí vienen los Indios!, the unofficial team song 

The unofficial team song for the Indios is ¡Ahí vienen los Indios!, a Dominican merengue recorded by the 1959 lineup of the Billo's Caracas Boys orchestra, led by its longtime conductor, Billo Frómeta, and augmented by two former Billo's bandmates, Ernesto Chapuseaux and Francisco Simó Damirón, who had reunited with Frómeta for the occasion. The song is usually played at the  game's Seventh-inning stretch.

Other songs referring to the team 
The city  of Mayagüez has a formal anthem, "Mayagüez, Mi Mayagüez", written by local music professor Luciano Quiñones, but before the song was commissioned as such, the city's unofficial theme song was (and still is) Cesar Concepción's plena A Mayagüez, which references the team. The song suggests that the singer will visit the city to "vacilar con los Indios, que en verdad echan candela" ("have fun with the Indios, which are really on fire lately")."

A historical (yet unofficial) team song is the plena "El Mayagüez Invencible", which is generally attributed to Ceferino "Cefo" Conde, a pitcher (and baseball philosopher) who played for multiple PRBL teams, and who was instrumental to the Indios' first championship win in 1949. The plena names every single Mayagüez player in the 1949 team's initial lineup, along with their playing position.

Mon Rivera, who was a successful shortstop with the Indios before becoming an even more successful bandleader, wrote a humorous song about an anecdote he experienced while he was related to the team. It makes mention of Humberto "Pita" Martí, one of the team's catchers. Martí was good enough as a catcher to deserve having his number eventually retired by the team. Apparently, though, his English language skills were not as good. Since the team featured major baseball players from the United States, interaction among players had to happen in English, Spanish, Spanglish, sign language or a combination thereof. Apparently Martí was asked "how do you feel?" before a game, to which he replied: "yo no juego field, lo que juego es catcher de Mayagüez" ("I'm not a fielder, I play catcher for Mayagüez"). The joke persisted enough to deserve a song, "¿Cómo está Pita?"

Indio de Mayagüez, the team's original mascot 
Between the late 1970s, and the early 2000s, the "Indio de Mayagüez" character became an unofficial cheerleader of the team. During the 2011–12 season the Indio made a short-lived comeback. The Indio, interpreted by Ervin Santana, is namely a costumed fan wearing a woolen poncho and feathered headdress who demands cheers from the audience for the local team and boos for the visitors. The Indio then finishes his session by placing a handkerchief (or a banner borrowed from a fan) on one side of the Indios dugout's roof, walking to the opposite side, and then running and sliding towards the handkerchief to pick it up head-first, as if he were stealing a base.

At one time during the late 1990s, the cheerleader sled past the dugout's roof and landed on a nearby staircase, fracturing a leg and three ribs. After a long convalescence, the Indio returned to his usual chanting grounds on top of the stadium's first base dugout, calling for cheers wearing a cast and crutches. At times the Indio is allowed into the infield, runs the bases, and steals home plate.

Bompy, the (overloaded) Indios mascot 

As of the 2013–14 season, Bompy, a cartoon character originally developed for the Indios de Mayaguez basketball team, has also made his appearance in the baseball team's games. Bompy, a mischievous kid, has its own Facebook page, and is a popular character among both teams' younger fans.

Radio broadcasts 

The Indios de Mayagüez radio broadcast crew has had one constant member during the last  years (as of ), radio announcer Arturo Soto Cardona. A native of nearby San Sebastián, Puerto Rico, Soto has been narrating Indios' games since 1977.

Fiercely territorial as some Indios fans are, a common practice for many of them is to turn the volume down on television broadcasts featuring the Indios, and turning a radio set on to the official Indios radio broadcast, which is aired on station WYEL-AM (600 kHz) and streamcasted over the Internet. Soto's vocal inflections are so well recognized by fans that by just listening to his voice many can identify the difference between a pop-up fly and a hit before the ball actually lands.

A former member of the broadcast team, commercial spot coordinator David Castro had a reputation for having attended all Indios games home and abroad (except for one non-local game during the early 1960s) since the team's inception in 1938 until his formal retirement in 2005.

Documentary 
A documentary about the team named "Los Indios de mi pueblo" and directed by Emmanuel Díaz, was issued in 2011.

References

External links 
Official team website

1938 establishments in Puerto Rico
Baseball teams established in 1938
Liga de Béisbol Profesional Roberto Clemente
Professional baseball teams in Puerto Rico
Sports in Mayagüez, Puerto Rico